Lingcheng may refer to the following locations in China:

 Lingcheng, Anhui (灵城镇), town in Lingbi County
 Lingcheng, Guangxi (灵城镇), town in Lingshan County
 Lingcheng, Jiangsu (凌城镇), town in Suining County
 Lingcheng, Shandong (陵城镇), town in Qufu